Indelicato is an Italian surname. Notable people with the surname include:

Al Indelicato (1931-1981), a high-ranking member of New York City's Bonanno crime family
Anthony Indelicato (born 1947), a member of the Bonanno crime family and son of the above
Mark Indelicato (born 1994), American actor

Italian-language surnames